Kate Lutkins (born 31 May 1988) is an Australian rules footballer playing for the Brisbane Lions in the AFL Women's. She was the "best player on the ground" at the 2021 AFL Women's Grand Final.

Early life
Lutkins was born in 1988 in Brisbane, Queensland. Her mother is Debbie Bowe.

She attended and completed high school at West Moreton Anglican College and Ipswich Girls' Grammar School, in Ipswich, Queensland. 

Lutkins captained the "undefeated" Yeronga Devils Aussie Rules team.

In 2012 she was working as an animal technician for the University of Queensland when she was announced as the captain of the national team to play in October at the Pacific Cup in San Francisco.

She was playing for Wilston Grange when she was drafted.

AFLW career
She made her debut in the Lions' inaugural game against  at Casey Fields on 5 February 2017. At the end of the season, she won the Lions' Most Courageous award. Her 2018 season was rewarded with the club best and fairest. The 2020 AFL Women's season saw Lutkins obtain her second AFL Women's All-Australian team selection, named in the full back position.

Lutkins was awarded the medal for the best player on the ground at the 2021 AFL Women's Grand Final. She finished with 18 disposals, seven of them contested, and had ten rebound 50s. She played in pain, and was scheduled to have surgery on both feet, having torn the plantar fascia in her left foot during round eight. At the conclusion of the 2021 AFL Women's season, Lutkins was awarded with her third All-Australian blazer, named on the half back position.
In AFLW Season 6, Kate tore her acl early in the round 1 match against Adelaide Crows. This ruled her out for the remainder of the season.
Ahead of schedule, she stunned the football world by returning in round 5 of season 7 of the AFLW against Essendon Bombers at Burpengary.

Statistics
Statistics are correct to the end of the 2021 season.

|- style="background:#EAEAEA"
| scope="row" text-align:center | 2017
| 
| 13 || 8 || 1 || 0 || 59 || 7 || 66 || 12 || 17 || 0.1 || 0.0 || 7.4 || 0.9 || 8.3 || 1.5 || 2.1 || 0
|-
| scope="row" text-align:center | 2018
| 
| 13 || 8 || 1 || 0 || 105 || 37 || 142 || 31 || 26 || 0.1 || 0.0 || 13.1 || 4.6 || 17.8 || 3.9 || 3.3 || 2
|- style="background:#EAEAEA"
| scope="row" text-align:center | 2019
| 
| 13 || 7 || 0 || 2 || 74 || 20 || 94 || 27 || 24 || 0.0 || 0.3 || 10.6 || 2.9 || 13.4 || 3.9 || 3.4 || 0
|- 
| scope=row | 2020 ||  || 13
| 7 || 1 || 0 || 75 || 18 || 93 || 31 || 22 || 0.1 || 0.0 || 10.7 || 2.6 || 13.3 || 4.4 || 3.1 || 5
|- style=background:#EAEAEA
| scope=row bgcolor=F0E68C | 2021# ||  || 13
| 11 || 0 || 0 || 98 || 38 || 136 || 44 || 21 || 0.0 || 0.0 || 8.9 || 3.5 || 12.4 || 4.0 || 1.9 || 0
|- class="sortbottom"
! colspan=3 | Career
! 41
! 3
! 2
! 411
! 120
! 531
! 145
! 110
! 0.1
! 0.1
! 10.0
! 2.9
! 13.0
! 3.5
! 2.7
! 7
|}

Private life
Lutkins married her partner, Kate Clarkson on 15 April 2022.

References

External links

1988 births
Living people
Sportspeople from Brisbane
Sportswomen from Queensland
Australian rules footballers from Queensland
Brisbane Lions (AFLW) players
All-Australians (AFL Women's)
Australian LGBT sportspeople
LGBT players of Australian rules football